Chalakhvor (also Romanized as Chalākhvor and Chalakhur; also known as Chīlākhowr, Chīlākhvor, and Galakhur) is a village in Sojas Rud Rural District, Sojas Rud District, Khodabandeh County, Zanjan Province, Iran. At the 2006 census, its population was 288, in 66 families.

References 

Populated places in Khodabandeh County